Liang Baohua (born November 1945) was CPC Jiangsu Committee Secretary and the province's governor.

Biography
A native of Yichun, Jiangxi, Liang joined the Communist Party of China in November 1965. 

Prior to 1968 he worked in the communes around Taicang. Since then his entire career has been in Jiangsu. He became the province's governor in December 2002, and succeeded Li Yuanchao as the party chief of the province in 2007, becoming the first-in-charge of one of the most prominent areas of economic development in China. He retired from active politics in 2010 after having reached the retirement age of 65, and then sat on the National People's Congress Financial and Economic Affairs Committee as a deputy chair. He was also named head of the Organizing Committee of the 2014 Summer Youth Olympics in Nanjing.

References 

Living people
1945 births
Politicians from Yichun, Jiangxi
Governors of Jiangsu
People's Republic of China politicians from Jiangxi
Chinese Communist Party politicians from Jiangxi
Fudan University alumni